KXTC (99.9 FM) is a radio station broadcasting a Rhythmic CHR music format. Licensed to Thoreau, New Mexico, United States. The station is currently owned by iHeartMedia, Inc.

References

External links
 

XTC
Radio stations established in 1964
Contemporary hit radio stations in the United States
IHeartMedia radio stations